Völklingen (Moselle Franconian: Välglinge) is a town in the district of Saarbrücken, in Saarland, Germany. It is situated on the river Saar, approx. 10 km west of Saarbrücken, and directly borders France.

The town is known for its industrial past, the Völklinger Hütte (ironworks) being declared by UNESCO as a World Heritage Site.

Subdivisions
The town is divided into ten Stadtteile (quarters):

 Völkingen
 Fenne
 Fürstenhausen
 Geislautern
 Heidstock
 Lauterbach
 Ludweiler
 Luisenthal
 Röchlinghöhe
 Wehrden

Geography
Völklingen is situated on the fertile alluvial plane at the confluence of the river Rossel and of the river Köller into the river Saar.

History
In antiquity it was settled by Celtic tribes, then by the Romans. The Franks colonized the area between the 5th and 9th centuries. Völkingen was initially referred to as "Fulcolingas" by Durandis, Vice Chancellor to Louis the Pious in 822.

Peasants living in the area were subject to taxation by the Count of Saarbrücken. The peasants of Völkingen revolted against the Count of Saarbrücken in 1566, when he ordered the construction of the Homburger castle.

Twin towns – sister cities

Völklingen is twinned with:
 Ars-sur-Moselle, France
 Forbach, France
 Les Lilas, France

Notable people
Johannes Schulz (1884–1942), catholic priest, died of hunger in Dachau concentration camp
Hermann Neuberger (1919–1992), president of DFB
Annegret Kramp-Karrenbauer (born 1962), politician (CDU)
Daniel Sträßer (born 1987), actor 
Carrie Schreiner (born 1998), racing driver

Gallery

References

External links

 
Historical facts about Völklingen 

Towns in Saarland
Saarbrücken (district)